Volodymyr Riznyk (born 15 February 1966) is a retired Ukrainian football midfielder.

References

1966 births
Living people
Ukrainian footballers
FC Polissya Zhytomyr players
NK Veres Rivne players
FC Karpaty Lviv players
FC Lviv (1992) players
Association football midfielders